Tampines Concourse Bus Interchange is a bus interchange serving Tampines in Singapore. It is within walking distance of Tampines MRT station and Tampines Bus Interchange.

History
The Interchange was opened on 18 December 2016 and serves Bus Services 129, 18, and 39. Nearby bus stops give commuters access to the MRT Station.

On 21 October 2017, Feeder Bus Service 298 was introduced under the Bus Service Enhancement Programme (BSEP). Service 298 was launched together with the official opening of Downtown Line 3.

From 27 November 2022, Bus Services 18 and 129 were amended to call at Tampines North Bus Interchange, leaving the other 2 bus services remaining at the interchange.

From 8 January 2023, Bus Service 298 was amended to call at Tampines North Bus Interchange, leaving Bus Service 39 remaining at the interchange.

Bus Contracting Model

Under the new bus contracting model, all the bus routes terminating at the interchange are under the Tampines Bus Package.

References

External links
 

Bus stations in Singapore
Tampines